Stephen or Steven Joyce may refer to:

Stephen A. Joyce (born 1931), American law enforcement official 
Stephen James Joyce (1932–2020), French-Irish literary executor 
Stephen Joyce (Gaelic footballer) (born 1957), Irish Gaelic football manager and former player
Steven Joyce (Maine politician) (born 1969), American politician from Maine
Stephen P. Joyce (born c. 1961), American businessman
Steven Joyce (born 1963), New Zealand broadcast technology entrepreneur and legislator

See also
Joyce (name)